Damir Čerkić (born 14 February 1969 in Mostar) is a former Bosnian-Herzegovinian football player, from the late 1980s and the beginning of the 1990s.

Club career
Čerkić was product of Velež Mostar youth system and after spending two and a half seasons in first team of Velež, in spring of 1991 he joined Hajduk Split. When war in Croatia began, he moved to Borac Banja Luka. There, he was the part of the team which defeated Red Star Belgrade in 1991/92 season. Afterwards, he moved to Denmark to play for B 1909 Odense.

References
2. www.ukr.worldfootball.net/ugc/damir-cerkic

External links 
 data at Arhiva hajduk.hr
 Victory against Red Star
 stats in season 1991/92
 stats in Denmark

1969 births
Living people
Sportspeople from Mostar
Association football defenders
Yugoslav footballers
Bosnia and Herzegovina footballers
FK Velež Mostar players
HNK Hajduk Split players
FK Borac Banja Luka players
Boldklubben 1909 players
Yugoslav First League players
Danish Superliga players
Bosnia and Herzegovina expatriate footballers
Expatriate men's footballers in Denmark
Bosnia and Herzegovina expatriate sportspeople in Denmark